Gaius Claudius Severus was a Roman senator who lived in the second half of the 1st century AD and the first half of the 2nd century AD.

Life
Part of a family of Pontian Greek descent, Severus was born and raised in Pompeiopolis, a city in the Roman province of Galatia.

Severus was a magistrate in the reign of the Emperor Trajan (98-117). Trajan had successfully annexed Arabia Petraea in 105 to 106, and appointed Severus as its first governor, who organized the region into a Roman province. Severus remained in the office from 106 until 116.

During his tenure a road, Via Nova Traiana, was paved from Aqaba via Petra to Bozrah. There are two surviving letters that mention the construction of the road, sent by Apollonarius, an Egyptian soldier and assistant secretary to Severus, dated to early 107. One is addressed to his father, the other to his mother. A milestone found near Thoana, 54 miles north of Petra, attests that it was completed in 110/111.

He was suffect consul in absentia in the nundinium of October-December 112 with Titus Settidius Firmus as his colleague.

Severus married an unnamed Roman woman and had a son named Gnaeus Claudius Severus Arabianus, ordinary consul in 146.

References

Sources
 
 

1st-century births
2nd-century deaths
1st-century Romans
2nd-century Romans
2nd-century Roman governors of Arabia Petraea
Roman governors of Arabia Petraea
Suffect consuls of Imperial Rome
Severus, Gaius